Human influenza hemagglutinin (HA) is a surface glycoprotein required for the infectivity of the human influenza virus. The HA-tag is derived from the HA-molecule corresponding to amino acids 98-106. HA-tag has been extensively used as a general epitope tag in expression vectors. 
 Many recombinant proteins have been engineered to express the HA-tag, which does not generally appear to interfere with the bioactivity or the biodistribution of the recombinant protein. This tag facilitates the detection, isolation and purification of the protein of interest.

The HA-tag is not suitable for detection or purification of proteins from apoptotic cells since it is cleaved by Caspase-3 and / or Caspase-7 after its sequence DVPD, causing it to lose its immunoreactivity. Labeling of endogenous proteins with HA-tag using CRISPR was recently accomplished in-vivo in differentiated neurons.

Sequence 
The DNA sequences for the HA-tag include: 5' TAC CCA TAC GAT GTT CCA GAT TAC GCT 3' or 5' TAT CCA TAT GAT GTT CCA GAT TAT GCT 3'

The resulting amino acid sequence: YPYDVPDYA (Tyr-Pro-Tyr-Asp-Val-Pro-Asp-Tyr-Ala).

See also 

 Protein tag
 SpyTag

References

Further reading 

 

Biochemistry detection methods
Biochemical separation processes
Influenza A virus
Viral structural proteins